Micropterix emiliensis is a species of moth belonging to the family Micropterigidae that was described by Viette in 1950, and is endemic to Italy.

References

External links
lepiforum.de

Endemic fauna of Italy
Moths of Europe
Micropterigidae
Moths described in 1950
Taxa named by Pierre Viette